Prosper Depredomme (26 May 1918 – 8 November 1997) was a Belgian racing cyclist. He rode in the 1947 Tour de France. He won Liège–Bastogne–Liège in 1946 and 1950.

References

External links
 

1918 births
1997 deaths
Belgian male cyclists
Sportspeople from Deux-Sèvres
Cyclists from Nouvelle-Aquitaine